German submarine U-974 was a Type VIIC U-boat of Nazi Germany's Kriegsmarine during World War II.

She was ordered on 5 June 1941, and was laid down on 26 June 1942 at Blohm & Voss, Hamburg, as yard number 174. She was launched on 11 March 1943 and commissioned under the command of Oberleutnant zur See Joachim Zaubitzer on 22 April 1943.

Design
German Type VIIC submarines were preceded by the shorter Type VIIB submarines. U-974 had a displacement of  when at the surface and  while submerged. She had two shafts and two  propellers.

U-974 was fitted with five  torpedo tubes (four fitted at the bow and one at the stern), fourteen torpedoes or 26 TMA mines, one  SK C/35 naval gun, 220 rounds, and one twin  C/30 anti-aircraft gun. The boat had a complement of between 44 — 52 men.

Service history
On 19 April 1944, U-974 was sunk by torpedoes near Stavanger, Norway, in the Boknafjord. U-974 was attacked by a Norwegian submarine, . Eight of the crew of fifty survived.

Discovery of wreck
In 1996, an ROV at a depth of about  discovered the wreck of U-974.

References

Bibliography

External links

German Type VIIC submarines
U-boats commissioned in 1943
World War II submarines of Germany
Ships built in Hamburg
1943 ships
U-boats sunk by Norwegian submarines
Maritime incidents in April 1944
World War II shipwrecks in the North Sea